Yuzhnoye is a rural locality (a selo) and the administrative centre of Yuzhny Selsoviet, Kizlyarsky District, Republic of Dagestan, Russia. The population was 1,791 as of 2010. There are 27 streets.

Nationalities 
Avars, Russians, Dargins, Lezgins and Kumyks live there.

Geography 
Yuzhnoye is located 5 km south of Kizlyar (the district's administrative centre) by road. Kizlyar is the nearest rural locality.

References 

Rural localities in Kizlyarsky District